Chapman is a masculine given name which may refer to:

 Chapman L. Anderson (1845–1924), American politician and Confederate lieutenant colonel
 Chapman Cohen (1868–1954), English freethinker, atheist, writer and lecturer
 Chapman Freeman (1832–1904), American politician
 Chapman Grant (1887–1983), American herpetologist, historian and publisher
 Chapman H. Hyams (1838–1923), American stockbroker, art collector and philanthropist
 Chapman Johnson (1777–1849), American politician
 Chapman Pincher (1914–2014), English journalist, historian and novelist
 Chapman Revercomb (1895–1979), American politician and lawyer
 Chapman Way, American documentary film director and producer

English-language masculine given names